Throxenby is a suburb of Scarborough, in North Yorkshire, England. Historically the settlement of Throxenby was a hamlet, separated from Scarborough by countryside.

History 
Throxenby is not mentioned in the Domesday Book, and is first recorded as T'Stanebi in 1167. The name derives from a personal name and means Thorstan's Farm. Post the Conquest, the land that formed the eventual Scalby Parish belonged to the crown, but was donated by Henry III to his son Edmund in 1257. However, in 1276, William de Morers gave his land at Throxenby and the manor to Henry de Percy.

Lady Edith's Drive was built to connect the main road at Scalby with Throxenby Mere by the 1st Earl of Londesborough, who named it after his wife. Whilst the Londesborough family were the principal landowners in the area, the lord or lady of the manor is given to those who hold the title of the Duchy of Lancaster, which is the ruling monarch of the time as the estates belong to the crown. It has been suggested by archaeological surveys that the settlement in Medieval times never had an official manor house or church, and that it was populated by tenant farmers, with houses strung out along Throxenby Lane. However, in 1660, Christopher Keld of Newby built a manorial house, which was again replace. and became known as Throxenby Hall.

, a military barracks was built in the township, around the same time that Burniston Barracks were built. In 1946, North Riding County Council (later North Yorkshire County Council from 1974), acquired Throxenby Hall and turned it into a home for boys from across the county. The home was closed in 1991, and was later converted into flats.

In 2004, a new St Catherine's Hospice as opened in Throxenby, having previously being located on Scalby Road.

Within the area formerly covered by Throxenby parish, is the deserted Medieval village of Hatterboard (at TA017887).

Governance 
Historically, Throxenby and the surrounding area was part of the wapentake of Pickering Lythe.

In 1831, Throxenby was a township in parish of Scalby, but in 1894, it was partnered with Newby in that civil parish. From 1909, the parish of Newby was subsumed into the neighbouring Scalby Civil Parish. It is now in the Newby and Scalby civil parish, and is represented at Westminster as part of the Scarborough and Whitby Constituency.

Throxenby Mere 

Throxenby Mere is a body of water to the west of the village immediately below Raincliff Woods and Irton Moor. Early maps do not show a body of water, though the ground being a natural hollow, it is thought to have been quite marshy and prone to flooding. The mere was dammed in the 19th century, and the outflow now runs along the southern edge of Lady Edith's Drive in the area. Wildlife observed on the mere includes mallards, tufted ducks and smews.

References

Sources 

Populated places in North Yorkshire
Former civil parishes in North Yorkshire
Scarborough, North Yorkshire